Two ships of the Royal Australian Navy (RAN) ships have been named HMAS Protector.
, a gunboat operated by the South Australian colonial navy and the RAN between 1884 and 1943
, a trials ship operated by the RAN between 1990 and 1998, and by Defence Maritime Services from that date

Battle honours
Ships named HMAS Protector are entitled to carry two battle honours:
China 1900
Rabaul 1914

See also
 , seven ships of the Royal Navy
 , a Canadian naval base established at Sydney, Nova Scotia in 1943 and operating until 1965

References

Royal Australian Navy ship names